Darbhung is a village development committee in Gorkha District in the Gandaki Zone of northern-central Nepal. At the time of the 68 Nepal census it had a population of 15005 and had 3900 houses in the town.

References

Populated places in Gorkha District